Angee Hughes (born November 22, 1955) is an American actress who has appeared in film, television and theatre productions. She is best known for her role as Wanda Gilmore on the PBS series Wishbone.

Early life and education 
Hughes, a native of Memphis, studied theatre arts at Texas State University and subsequently trained at the Circle in the Square Theatre School in New York City.

Career 
She played the role of Sara Bardshar in the Spanish–American War themed miniseries Rough Riders and appeared in the Showtime production Lily Dale, alongside Mary Stuart Masterson and Stockard Channing. She has also appeared in a number of television sitcoms including Scrubs and The King of Queens. She also appeared in one episode of the ninth season of Friends, in "The One with the Pediatrician".

Filmography

Film

Television

References

External links

1955 births
Living people
American film actresses
American television actresses
Actresses from Memphis, Tennessee
20th-century American actresses
21st-century American actresses
Texas State University alumni
Circle in the Square Theatre School alumni